Bridgehampton Polo Club is a polo club in Bridgehampton, New York founded in the 1990s. It is most widely known as the host club for the Mercedes Benz Polo Challenge at Two Trees Farm, generally held in July of each year.

The Club is open for six consecutive Saturdays each year between July and August for public viewing.

The Club colours are navy and white.

References

External links

 Bridgehampton Polo Club web-site
 Bridgehampton Polo

Polo clubs in the United States
Southampton (town), New York
Clubs and societies in the United States